Worcester Park railway station serves the Worcester Park area in south-west London, England. It opened in 1859 when the London and South Western Railway completed the Epsom branch. It was originally known as "Old Malden" and was renamed "Worcester Park" in 1862. Following substantial local housing development, the station was refurbished in the 1930s.

The station is in the Royal Borough of Kingston upon Thames, just to the west of the boundary with the London Borough of Sutton. The station is managed by South Western Railway, which also operates all trains serving it, and it is located in Travelcard Zone 4.

The station has a small concession stand selling newspapers, magazines, coffee and pastries. There is a taxi office on the station estate; bus stops served by various Transport for London routes; a 24-hour, 90-space car park; cycle parking; a waiting room and toilets. The car park is largely sited on the area formerly used as a goods yard. The station has no automated barriers; however, Oyster Pre-Pay has been made available by National Rail at the station. 

Disabled access used to be poor: the London bound platform was accessible, but access to the southbound platform was only via the pedestrian bridge or a long set of steps. However, in June 2014 a new passenger bridge was opened (coinciding with the removal of the old footbridge). The new bridge is equipped with lifts to permit disabled access between platforms.

In December 2007 there was a landslide on the line near the station which caused major disruptions and cancellations to all services passing through the station for one week.

Services

Current Services
All services at Worcester Park are operated by South Western Railway using  EMUs.<p>Until 2022, Class 456 trains were often attached to Class 455 units to form ten carriage trains, but these were withdrawn on 17th January with the introduction of a new timetable.
<p>

The typical off-peak service in trains per hour were reduced during the COVID-19 pandemic by 50% and are currently:
 2 tph to  via 
 1 tph to 
 1 tph to 

On Sundays, the service to London Waterloo reduces to 2 tph and the services to Dorking and Guildford are reduced to 1 tph each.

Future Services
Under Transport for London's (TfL) initial plans for Crossrail 2, it was proposed that those would stop only at certain hub stations. Worcester Park was not scheduled to be a hub station, the nearest being at Motspur Park, the next station to the north. A petition for Worcester Park to be a designated stop, signed by 1,129 signatories, was presented to the Mayor of London on 15 January 2014. In October 2015, TfL announced a set of local consultations would take place and their amended proposal provides that Crossrail 2 trains will now stop at all stations on the routes to the south and west of Wimbledon. The result is that Crossrail 2 trains should now stop at Worcester Park although construction of the line is currently on hold due to a lack of available funding.

Connections
London Buses routes 151, 213, S3, X26 and E16 serve the station.

References

External links

Railway stations in the Royal Borough of Kingston upon Thames
Former London and South Western Railway stations
Railway stations in Great Britain opened in 1859
Railway stations served by South Western Railway